The Lanai island-aster or Lanai hesperomannia (Hesperomannia arborescens) is a species of flowering plant in the family Asteraceae.

It is found only in Hawaii, where there are fewer than 200 individuals remaining. Most are in the Koʻolau Range of Oahu, and there are a few on Molokai, Maui, and Lanai. It is a perennial shrub or tree. It grows in wet forests and shrublands.

It is threatened by habitat loss.

References

External links
  IUCN Red List of all Threatened Species

arborescens
Endemic flora of Hawaii
Biota of Lanai
Biota of Maui
Biota of Molokai
Biota of Oahu
Taxonomy articles created by Polbot